Riccarda Dietsche (born 30 April 1996) is a Swiss athlete. She competed in the women's 4 × 100 metres relay event at the 2020 Summer Olympics.

References

1996 births
Living people
Swiss female sprinters
Athletes (track and field) at the 2020 Summer Olympics
Olympic athletes of Switzerland
Place of birth missing (living people)
Universiade medalists in athletics (track and field)
Universiade gold medalists for Switzerland